Chengdong District is one of four districts of the prefecture-level city of Xining, the capital of Qinghai Province, Northwest China.

Subdivisions
 Dongguan Street Subdistrict
 Qingzhen Alley Subdistrict
 Dazhong Street Subdistrict
 Zhoujiaquan Subdistrict
 Huochezhan Subdistrict
 Bayi Road Subdistrict
 Linjiaya Subdistrict
 Lejiawan
 Yunjiakou

See also
 List of administrative divisions of Qinghai

County-level divisions of Qinghai
Xining